Edoardo "Edo" Mortara (born 12 January 1987) is a Swiss-Italian-French professional racing driver for Maserati MSG Racing. Born in Geneva, Switzerland, he holds triple nationality from all three countries. He is a former Formula Three Euroseries champion and he almost claimed the DTM title with Audi in 2016. In 2021, he finished as the Vice Champion in the FIA Formula E World Companionship. He is a street circuit specialist and renowned as "Mr Macau". Currently, he is racing in the Formula E championship for the Venturi Team.

He is renowned as "Mr Macau" as he has amassed ten wins (with seven overall victories) in Macau from 2008 to 2017 in F3 and GT races. These wins include 2008 F3 Qualification Race, 2009 F3 Main Race, 2010 F3 Qualification Race and Main Race, 2011, 2012, 2013 Macau GT Races, 2013 Audi R8 LMS Race and 2017 Macau GT World Cup Qualification Race and Main Race. This is a record for any driver or rider in Macau up to date.

In 2017–2018, he drove for the Venturi Formula E Team. In the first weekend of his Formula E races in Hong Kong, his performances stood out as a rookie as he finished seventh after charging from the field in the first race. And in the second race, he led most of the race until a spin which cost him the victory. However, he still finished in second place and claimed the best-ever result for the Venturi team in FE season 4.

In 2018–2019 season, he claimed a podium finish in Mexico and his first ever FE victory in Hong Kong on 10 March 2019. After his win, a string of bad luck and poor reliability had put Edo out of the championship contention. Despite these problems, he still finished season 5 as the highest-placed Venturi powertrain driver with 52 points (Massa 36 points, Vandoorne 35 points and Paffett 9 points).

In 2019–2020 season, he performed consistently and finished in the points in 7 out of 11 races. His best result was a 4th place in Diriyah. Overall, he finished season 6 with 41 points and comprehensively outscore his teammate Felipe Massa by 41–3 points.

In the 2020–2021 season, he took a win in the Puebla ePrix and 3 more podium finishes. He finished the season strongly as the Vice-Champion with 92 points.

In the 2021–2022 season, he finished third in the overall standing with 169 points as he took 4 wins, 2 more podiums, 2 pole positions and 2 fastest lap awards in season 8 races.

Career

Early career

In 2006 he stepped up to Formula racing, starting in Formula Renault, he becomes the top rookie in the Italian Formula Renault and also gaining experience in Eurocup Formula Renault. In 2008, he finished second in the F3 Euroseries championship, ahead of third place Jules Bianchi. He also won the Macau Grand Prix qualifying race and finished a close second place in the main race that year.

At the end of the 2009 season, Mortara returned to Formula Three to contest the Macau Grand Prix with Signature, after driven some uncompetitive GP2 machines early in the season. He went on to win the event easily ahead of team-mate Jean Karl Vernay. In 2010, he contested 2010 campaign in the Formula Three Euroseries. He won the championship and then signed for Audi to drive for their DTM cars from 2011.

In November 2010, he won the Macau F3 Grand Prix for the second time in a row. He became the first-ever driver to have won this famous event 2 times.

For 2011, Mortara made a switch to the DTM series driving for Audi Team Rosberg. He made his progress steadily season by season.

In 2016, he lost the DTM title by just 4 points.

Since 2017, he switched to Mercedes Benz after having almost won the DTM title with Audi in 2016.

He is renowned as "Mr Macau" as he has won 10 times in Macau from 2008 to 2017 in F3 and GT races. These wins include 2008 F3 Qualification Race, 2009 F3 Main Race, 2010 F3 Qualification Race and Main Race, 2011, 2012, 2013 Macau GT Races, 2013 Audi R8 LMS Race and 2017 Macau GT World Cup Qualification Race and Main Race. This is a record for any driver or rider in Macau up to date.

Formula E (2017–present)

2017–2018 season 
In 2017–2018, he drove for the Venturi Formula E team. In the first weekend of his Formula E races in Hong Kong, his performances stood out as a rookie as he finished seventh after charging from the field in the first race. And in the second race, he led most of the race, but had a spin in the closing laps, causing him to finish in second place behind Rosenqvist.

On 19 May 2018, he won his first DTM race for the Mercedes Benz at EuroSpeedway Lausitz. He then also claimed pole and victory on 23 June 2018 at Norisring. He finished the season in 6th position. During his DTM career, he has got 10 wins, 26 podiums, 5 poles and 6 fastest laps.

2018–2019 season 
In 2018–2019, he would concentrate on the Formula E series and drive for the Venturi team again. In the fourth race of the season, he scored his first podium finish of the season in Mexico. And on 10 March 2019, he claimed his first FE victory for himself and Venturi team in Hong Kong. It was a hard-earned victory for him on a track that last year saw him throw away a victory when he was comfortably leading.

After his win in Hong Kong, a string of bad luck and poor reliability had put Edo out of the championship contention. In Sanya, he was almost taken out by a three-car shunt between  Buemi, Frijns and di Grassi and thrown out of points after receiving a 16-second time penalty for failing to activate the attack mode. Then, in Rome, a drive shaft failure forced him to retire when he was running a strong 6th. In Paris, he crashed from 7th position in the rain and eventually collided with Alex Lynn (which gave him a 3-place grid penalty in the next round).

In Monaco, an overtaking incident with Jérôme D’Ambrosio, damaged his front suspension and resulted in the untimely end to his race.
In Bern, after setting competitive times and clocking the 2nd fastest time in the 2nd free practice, the team made some wrong choices in qualifying. He would finish in a frustrated 11th. just outside the points eventually. Then, in Bern, a brake failure issue caused yet another retirement for him and in turn gave him another 5-place grid penalty for the New York round.

In the first race in New York, he overtook more than 10 cars after his grid penalty and was fighting for 9th position before being taken out by Max Gunther. In the second race, he qualified well in the top 10. But a front brake caliper failure forced him to retire early yet again.

However, he still finished season 5 as the highest-placed Venturi powertrain driver with 52 points (Massa 36 points, Vandoorne 35 points and Paffett 9 points).

2019–2020 season 
In the 2019–2020 season, Mortara started the season well with a solid 7th place in the first race in Diriyah. He then narrowly missed out on the podium by finishing 4th in the second race there.  In Santiago, bad luck hit Mortara in his qualifying lap as Robin Frijns spun in front of him that costed him his chance of superpole. In the race, he was forced to retire from 5th place after contact with Da Costa.

In Mexico, he had another solid performance by claiming 8th place in the race. In Marrakesh, he qualified well in 5th and performed brilliantly by finishing 5th in the race after battling with Buemi and Lotterer.

In the 6 races in Berlin after the COVID-19 pandemic, the Venturi seemed to lose its competitiveness against the manufacturer teams. However, Mortara still finished in points in 3 of these races.

In the end, he finished season 6 with 41 points and comprehensively outscored his teammate Felipe Massa by 41–3 points.

2020–2021 season 

Mortara started off the season with a strong second place in race one in Diriyah. The next day during free practice however, he suffered a freak incident. After doing the practice start procedure, his car lost brake pressure, causing him to go straight into the barriers at turn 18. Mercedes, who supplied the Mercedes-Benz EQ powertrains to the team, were forced to sit out qualifying along with Mortara's own ROKiT Venturi Racing car. They later stated that an incorrect software parameter meant the rear brake system didn't activate as intended and the fail-safe did not kick in. Mortara was released from the hospital but opted not to partake in race 2.

In Rome, his car refused to power up in qualifying and he was forced to start at the back of the grid in race one. Things didn't improve for the race and he was an early retirement with damage after hitting a slowing Sérgio Sette Câmara as the Dragon / Penske dived for the pitlane. On Sunday, however, he qualified seventh and scored a solid fourth place after battling hard with Maximilian Günther's BMW.

In the first race of the Valencia ePrix, Mortara was taken out by Lotterer in the rain and then ran out of energy as most cars did in the final stage of the race. On Sunday, he charged through the field to take 9th place and score another 2 points.

In the Monaco race, all Mercedes-powered cars were not as competitive as expected. Mortara qualified in the midfield after his qualifying run in group 2. He charged his way up to 9th position until the second last corner only to be hit from behind, and thus narrowly missed out on points.

In the first race of the Puebla ePrix, Mortara qualified a strong sixth after coming from group 2. He got past both BMWs in the race and finished on the podium for the second time in the season. On Sunday, he starred in qualifying again to take 3rd on the starting grid. In the race, he held off Wehrlein to earn his second Formula E victory as he moved top of the standings in the drivers' championship.

As the championship leader in New York, bad luck stroke Mortara as he was unable to set a full-power qualifying lap after a switch on his steering wheel locked into place, and he had to start at the back of the grid as a result. He managed to get pas 9 car and eventually finished 14th. On Sunday, he was out of points after tangling with Jake Dennis in the race.

In London's first race, despite setting the fastest time in qualifying group 1, Mortara could only manage to start from 16th on the grid. He charged his way to finish 9th and claimed 2 points. In the second race, he started in the midfield again but stalled on the grid. He would eventually finish 11th.

In the penultimate round of the 2020–21 season in Berlin, Mortara qualified a strong 4th. He was able to get past both DS techeetah in the race and threatened di Grassi's lead all the way until the chequered flag, with di Grassi just edging Mortara by 0.141s at the finish. 
 
He thus entered the season finale second in the drivers’ table with just a three-point deficit to Nyck de Vries. However, at the start of the race, a stalled Evans saw Mortara left nowhere to go and he smashed into Evan's car heavily. both title contenders were thus eliminated and Mortara sustained a fractured vertebra as a result of this collision.
 
Nevertheless, he still finished the season as the Vice-Champion in the 2020–21 season with 92 points.

2021–2022 season 
In season 8 of the Formula E season, Mortara bounced back and finished a strong sixth in the first race after his crash in the qualifying session in the Diriyah ePrix. In the second race, he qualified on the front row of the gird for the first time in his career.
In the race, he got past the pole sitter Nyck de Vries and scored his third win of his career. His new teammate Di Grassi finished third. This is the first ever double podium for the Venturi Formula E team.

In Mexico, Mortara qualified on the front row again. He took the lead from Pascal Wehrlein in the early stage of the race. However, his pace in the Venturi was not able to defend the faster  Porsche and DS techeetah cars and thus he finished the race in P5. He continued to lead the Formula E drivers' standings after 3 rounds.

The 4th and 5th rounds were held in Rome. Surprisingly, all Mercedes-powered cars did not perform as well as expected. Mortara qualified both race in only 11th. Despite being give a 5-second penalty for his collision with Rowland, he still climbed up the order and finished seventh in the first race. However, he was pushed by Da Costa and his car was broken in the second race.

In Monaco, he only qualified in the midfield but his race pace was really strong. He was able to make a comeback to P6 - until Di Grassi forced him off the track which resulted in a puncture and he had to retire. Team principal Jerome d'Ambrosio said that Di Grassi's move was unacceptable and disrespectful.

In the first race in Berlin, Mortara performed strongly and he took his first-ever pole position in Formula E by beating Alexander Sims in the final. He led the race from start to finish and took his second win of the season. On Sunday, he repeated his excellent performance in qualifying and took another pole in the reversed layout of the track. However, he was overtaken by Nyck de Vries at the start of the race. He went on to finish another strong second place in the race and took an extra point by clocking the fastest lap in the race.

The 9th round was held in Jakarta in Indonesia for the first time. In this brand new circuit, Mortara qualified well in 4th position. He was able to overtake Da Costa and was chasing Evans and Vergne for the win. At the chequered flag, he finished only 0.9 seconds behind Evans and had to settle for third place.

In the Marrakesh E-Prix, Mortara continued his strong form as he qualified on the front row of the grid. In the race, through the attack mode cycles, Mortara would take the race lead with Da Costa in pursuit. He kept his cool as both DS Techeetah drivers, Da Costa and Vergne, couldn't pass him in the later stage of the race. He won his 3rd race of the season and hit the top of the Drivers' World Championship with this victory.

The 11th and 12th rounds were held in New York. In the first race, Mortara qualified in 9th position. He enjoyed a strong drive to finish fifth and claimed the fastest lap award but a five-second penalty was given to him after the race. This relegated the Swiss driver to ninth, meaning he earned just three points from the opening race of the Brooklyn double-header. On Sunday, a braking problem in qualifying had marooned Mortara at the back of the grid. In the race, he was able to recover to finish in 10th and claim another fastest lap award.

The two races in London were disastrous for Mortara. On Saturday, after qualifying 9th, he got sandwiched by Sam Bird and Da Costa in the first corner of the race. Mortara had to repair the damaged front nose and his race was actually over because of this accident. On Sunday, he only qualified in the midfield. As he was climbing up the field, he spun off the track while trying to pass Sam Bird. He eventually finished in 13th place after another five-second penalty.

In the season finales in Seoul, Mortara qualified 6th in the first race. In the early stage of the race, after being hit by Vergne, Mortara was given a five-second penalty for changing his racing line under braking. Bad luck struck again as he had a puncture in his rear tyre. This ended his race and his title challenge was over. On Sunday, Mortara bounced back strongly as he qualified on the front row. He got past Da Costa on lap 2 and never looked back. He led comfortably to win his 4th race of the season. In the end, he finished the season strongly in third place overall with 169 points.

2022–23 season 
Mortara was retained by Venturi, as it becomes Maserati MSG Racing from the 2022–23 season onwards alongside a new teammate, Maximilian Günther.

The first round of the season was held in Mexico. However, the Maserati MSG Racing team's pace was not there during the whole weekend. He and his new teammate Guenther only qualified in the midfield and Mortara crashed out in the race.

In the Diriyah E-Prix double header, the Maserati team continued to struggle as both cars crashed in the qualifying of race 1. Mortara had to start at the back of the grid. He was able to make good progress through the field before an unfortunate puncture that forced him to retire. In race 2, Mortara bounced back strongly and qualified in a respectable 7th position. He ran as high as 5th in the early stages and finished in ninth. This brought the first points for the Maserati MSG Racing team.

The next round was held in Hyderabad. Mortara qualified in 7th position again after another strong performance in qualifying. In the race, he unfortunately crashed his front wing on lap 2. He charged his way from the back of the field after his pitstop and finished in 10th at the end of the race.

In the Cape Town ePrix, Mortara started the ePrix strongly as he clocked the fastest time in the first practice and was second fastest in the 2nd practice. However, luck was not on his side as he hit the wall in the qualifying. His car was repaired on time for the race but he was forced to retire after 1 lap after another mechanical failure.

Racing record

Career summary

† As Mortara was a guest driver, he was ineligible to score points.

Complete Eurocup Formula Renault 2.0 results
(key) (Races in bold indicate pole position) (Races in italics indicate fastest lap)

Complete Formula 3 Euro Series results
(key) (Races in bold indicate pole position) (Races in italics indicate fastest lap)

Complete GP2 Series results
(key) (Races in bold indicate pole position) (Races in italics indicate fastest lap)

Complete GP2 Asia Series results
(key) (Races in bold indicate pole position) (Races in italics indicate fastest lap)

Complete Formula Renault 3.5 Series results
(key) (Races in bold indicate pole position) (Races in italics indicate fastest lap)

Complete Deutsche Tourenwagen Masters results
(key) (Races in bold indicate pole position) (Races in italics indicate fastest lap)

† Driver did not finish, but was classified as he completed more than 90% of the race distance.

Complete Formula E results
(key) (Races in bold indicate pole position; races in italics indicate fastest lap)

† Driver did not finish, but was classified as he completed more than 90% of the race distance.

Notes

References

External links

 
 

1987 births
Living people
Sportspeople from Geneva
French people of Italian descent
Italian racing drivers
Formula 3 Euro Series drivers
Formula 3 Euro Series champions
Italian Formula Renault 2.0 drivers
Formula Renault Eurocup drivers
GP2 Series drivers
GP2 Asia Series drivers
World Series Formula V8 3.5 drivers
Deutsche Tourenwagen Masters drivers
24 Hours of Daytona drivers
Rolex Sports Car Series drivers
Blancpain Endurance Series drivers
Formula E drivers
Swiss racing drivers
Prema Powerteam drivers
Signature Team drivers
Arden International drivers
Tech 1 Racing drivers
Team Rosberg drivers
Audi Sport drivers
Abt Sportsline drivers
Phoenix Racing drivers
W Racing Team drivers
Mercedes-AMG Motorsport drivers
HWA Team drivers
Venturi Grand Prix drivers
Karting World Championship drivers
Kolles Racing drivers
SG Formula drivers
ISR Racing drivers
Mücke Motorsport drivers
ADAC GT Masters drivers
Nürburgring 24 Hours drivers
Saintéloc Racing drivers
Craft-Bamboo Racing drivers
Volkswagen Motorsport drivers